La Pierre is a commune in the Isère department in southeastern France. It is part of the Grenoble urban unit (agglomeration).

The commune is surrounded by agricultural land, giving the village its rural character.

Population

See also
Communes of the Isère department

References

External links
 Official website

Communes of Isère